Wellens is a surname. It may refer to:

Bart Wellens (born 1978), Belgian cyclo-cross and road cyclist
Corneille Wellens (1905-????), Belgian field hockey player 
Hein Wellens (1935–2020), Dutch cardiologist
Jacob Thomas Jozef Wellens (1726-1784), Roman Catholic bishop of Antwerp, Belgium
Jessie Wellens part of PrankvsPrank
Johan Wellens (born 1956), Belgian cyclist
Leo Wellens (born 1959), Belgian cyclist
Paul Wellens (born 1980), English rugby league footballer
Paul Wellens (cyclist) (born 1952), Belgian road cyclist
Richie Wellens (born 1980), English footballer
Tim Wellens (born 1991), Belgian road cyclist
Willy Wellens (born 1954), Belgian footballer

See also
Wellens' syndrome, electrocardiographic manifestation of critical proximal left anterior descending (LAD) coronary artery stenosis in people with unstable angina
Wellen (disambiguation)